Puckett Family Farm is a historic tobacco farm complex and national historic district located near Satterwhite, Granville County, North Carolina.  The farmhouse was built about 1899, and is a two-story, three bay, I-house dwelling rear kitchen ell.  Also on the property are the contributing packhouse, striphouse, four log barns, garage, smokehouse, well, brooder house, corn crib, stable, and privy.

It was listed on the National Register of Historic Places in 1988.

References

Tobacco buildings in the United States
Farms on the National Register of Historic Places in North Carolina
Historic districts on the National Register of Historic Places in North Carolina
Houses completed in 1899
Houses in Granville County, North Carolina
National Register of Historic Places in Granville County, North Carolina